The United States Coast Guard Auxiliary (USCGA, USCGAUX, CGAux, or USCG Aux) is the civilian uniformed volunteer component of the United States Coast Guard. Congress established the unit on 23 June 1939, as the United States Coast Guard Reserve. On 19 February 1941, the organization was re-designated as the United States Coast Guard Auxiliary. The Auxiliary exists to support all USCG missions on the water or in the air, except for roles that require "direct" law enforcement or military engagement. As of 2022, there were approximately 21,000 members of the U.S. Coast Guard Auxiliary.

Collectively the Auxiliary contributes over 4.5 million hours of service each year and completed nearly 500,000 missions in service to support the Coast Guard. Every year Auxiliarists help to save approximately 500 lives, assist 15,000 distressed boaters, conduct over 150,000 safety examinations of recreational vessels, and provide boater safety instruction to over 500,000 students. In total the Coast Guard Auxiliary saves taxpayers hundreds of millions of dollars each year.

History

The development of the single-operator motorboat, and later the outboard engine, during the early 20th century increased the number of recreational boaters operating on United States federal waters. By 1939 there were more than 300,000 personal watercraft in operation. The previous year the Coast Guard had received 14,000 calls for assistance and had responded to 8,600 "in-peril" cases.

Prior to World War II
The Coast Guard Reserve Act of 1939 was passed by the United States Congress creating a volunteer reserve force for the United States Coast Guard that would have four specified responsibilities. They were charged with promoting safety at sea, increasing boater efficiency for American citizens, assisting them with laws and compliance, and supporting active duty Coast Guardsmen. This encompassed boat owners being organized into flotillas within Coast Guard districts around the United States. They conducted safety and security patrols and helped enforce the 1940 Federal Boating and Espionage Acts. Commandant Russell Waesche and Commodore Malcolm Stuart Boylan are credited as the founders.

In 1941 Congress passed a law to restructure the Coast Guard Reserve which was created just two years earlier.  The Coast Guard would hence forth have two reserve forces. The existing volunteer organization would be renamed the Coast Guard Auxiliary.  In addition, the Coast Guard Reserve was created that year and would have military and law enforcement responsibilities.

During World War II
During World War II the Coast Guard maintained a unique category of reservist, the "Temporary Reservist," most drawn from the Auxiliary, who were uniformed and armed but unpaid, similar to a home guard. Coast Guard Headquarters also issued policies allowing some Auxiliarists and Auxiliary vessels to be armed. In 1941 the Coast Guard, Coast Guard Reserve, and Coast Guard Auxiliary were transferred from the United States Treasury Department to the United States Department of the Navy and in 1942 the Coast Guard Auxiliary was authorized to wear military uniforms.

During the war Auxiliarists helped the Coast Guard with recruiting and training active duty personnel. Beginning in 1942, in response to the growing German U-boat threat to the United States, the U.S. Navy ordered the acquisition of the "maximum practical number of civilian craft in any way capable of going to sea in good weather for a period of at least 48 hours." A large number of vessels, owned and piloted by Auxiliarists with crews made-up of Coast Guard reservists, made-up the bulk of the American coastal anti-submarine warfare capability during the early months of World War II (the so-called "Corsair Fleet"). As newly constructed warships took over the load, the Coast Guard abandoned the concept. None of the two thousand civilian craft, armed with depth charges stowed on their decks, ever sank a submarine, though they did rescue several hundred survivors of torpedoed merchant ships. From 1942 through the rest of the war Auxiliarists and Coast Guard reservists served on local Port Security Forces to protect the shipping industry.

Post World War II activities
In 1950 National Commodore Bert Pouncey was elected and the National Board for the Coast Guard Auxiliary was established. In 1955 Auxiliarists started to participate in programs to support the recruitment of potential candidates for the United States Coast Guard Academy.

The North American Boating Campaign was originally known as "Safe Boating Week," observed by the Coast Guard Auxiliary as a courtesy examination weekend in Amesbury, Massachusetts in June 1952. This tradition continued until 1957 when an official National Safe Boating Week observation took place sponsored by the United States Coast Guard Auxiliary in various parts of the country. As a result, the U.S. Coast Guard prepared a Resolution, and on 4 June 1958, President Dwight D. Eisenhower signed PL 85-445, to establish National Safe Boating Week as the first week starting on the first Sunday in June.

Early in 1973, budget cuts forced the closing of seven Coast Guard stations on the Great Lakes. At the request of the affected communities, Congress ordered the stations to be re-opened and operated by the Auxiliary. The local division captains took responsibility for manning them and ensuring that Auxiliarists' boats were always available to assist distressed vessels. The Auxiliary later took over seven more stations on the Mississippi and Ohio Rivers.

In 1976 the Coast Guard commissioned a study of the Auxiliary by a private research firm, University Sciences Forum of Washington. After interviewing key personnel in the Coast Guard and the Auxiliary and analyzing questionnaires filled out by about two thousand Auxiliarists, the researchers concluded that the Auxiliary was in good health. "In summary," they wrote, "we consider the Auxiliary the greatest economical resource readily available to the COGARD. It performs in an outstanding manner and its personnel are among the most professional group of volunteers in the nation."

Enhanced role for the auxiliarist
Under Congressional legislation passed in 1996, the Auxiliary's role was expanded to allow members to assist in any Coast Guard mission authorized by the Commandant of the U.S. Coast Guard. Current policy excludes Auxiliary personnel from exercising deputized law enforcement authority or involvement in military combat operations. As of 2004, the Coast Guard Auxiliary had 35,000 members who collectively provided 2 million man hours of service annually.

Under the Department of Homeland Security
In 2003 the Coast Guard, Coast Guard Reserve and Coast Guard Auxiliary were realigned to be under the United States Department of Homeland Security. As of 2004, the Coast Guard Auxiliary had 35,000 members who collectively provided 2 million man hours of service annually.

On 19 June 2009, the Commandant of the Coast Guard awarded the Coast Guard Unit Commendation to Auxiliary members for "performance ... nothing short of stellar" from the period of 24 June 1999, to 23 June 2009. On the 75th anniversary of the USCG Auxiliary, 23 June 2014, the Commandant awarded another Coast Guard Unit Commendation ribbon to all Auxiliarists.

On 16 May 2019, the U.S. Coast Guard Auxiliary was awarded a third Coast Guard Unit Commendation by Karl Schultz the Commandant of the Coast Guard.

A complete timeline of historical events for the Coast Guard Auxiliary can be found at this link

Programs and missions

Above all, the Auxiliary serves as a force multiplier for the Coast Guard. Auxiliarists promote safety, security, and assistance for the citizens of the United States in the harbors, seaports, coasts, canals, rivers across the country and in the air. The USCG wholly delegated to the Auxiliary its mission of promoting and improving recreational boater safety.  The Auxiliary also directly supports active duty and reservists in carrying out search and rescue, marine safety, waterways management, environmental protection, and various homeland security missions.

Missions

Recreational Boating Safety

The Auxiliary's most prominent role is promoting recreational boating safety ("RBS" in Auxiliary parlance).  The Auxiliary has several distinct programs that support this mission, most visibly:
 Providing free Vessel Safety Checks (formerly "Courtesy Marine Examinations") to recreational boaters;
 Delivering a Public Education (or "PE") program, which consists of a range of courses on boating-related topics such as seamanship, knots, laws and regulations related to boating, weather, and navigation; and
 Acting as a liaison to local businesses/organizations (such as marinas, boating clubs, civic clubs, etc.) through RBS Partnership Program Visitors (formerly "Marine Dealer Visitors).

Surface and Air Operations

The Coast Guard Auxiliary also engages in surface and air operations ("AUXAIR") in support of Coast Guard search & rescue, marine safety/security, environmental protection/response, and (to a lesser extent) law enforcement and national defense missions. Auxiliarists who own boats and aircraft may offer them to the Coast Guard for use as Auxiliary "facilities."  Auxiliarists qualified as boat crewmen, coxswains, pilots, air crew, and air observers can take part in these activities.

Auxiliary University Programs

The Auxiliary University Programs (AUP) is a Coast Guard Auxiliary-managed initiative established in 2007. Today AUP now has nearly 200 members in 11 units representing over 30 colleges and universities across the United States. AUP prepares undergraduate and graduate students for future public service inside and outside of the Coast Guard Auxiliary. Intended to function in a manner similar to ROTC programs, AUP provides students exposure to Coast Guard careers without requiring a service commitment, and more generally teaches students seamanship and leadership, and encourages public service. AUP has a positive track record of getting a large number of its graduates into Coast Guard Officer Candidate School and also offers an Internship Program.

Augmentation

The Auxiliary also directly augments the active duty Coast Guard in a number of ways. Auxiliarists can commonly be seen standing radio watches, assisting in boat maintenance, performing administrative duties, cooking, serving as morale officers, and undertaking other such support roles at Coast Guard units, particularly at small boat stations.

The Auxiliary also trains and provides members on an as-needed basis in areas such as emergency management. Auxiliarists have voluntarily deployed in support of disaster relief operations (notably Hurricane Katrina) and to provide support to Immigration and Customs Enforcement at the U.S.-Mexico border. The Coast Guard Auxiliary Interpreter Corps provides personnel who are fluent in languages other than English for assignments with both the Coast Guard and other federal agencies to support domestic and overseas deployments that require language and translation assistance. 

The Coast Guard has long had difficulty recruiting and retaining members to serve in the Culinary Specialist rating (i.e., cooks). The Auxiliary Food Service Specialist program provides Auxiliarists to fill these gaps in recruitment.

The Coast Guard, which has just one regular military band and color guard, also sometimes relies on Auxiliarists to perform these roles for events such as ship christenings and change-of-command ceremonies. In addition, the United States Coast Guard Pipe Band is formed from both Coast Guard Reserve and Coast Guard Auxiliary members.

Qualified Auxiliarists can also provide support to active duty/reserve Coast Guard members and their families as health care providers, legal assistance attorneys, financial counselors, and clergy.

Organization

The Coast Guard Auxiliary is situated in the Coast Guard's Office of Auxiliary and Boating Safety (CG-BSX), Auxiliary Division (CG-BSX-1), with the office of the Deputy Commandant for Operations (CG-DCO) in Coast Guard Headquarters. CG-DCO oversees the Assistant Commandant for Marine Safety, Security, and Stewardship (CG-5) who in turn oversees the Director of Prevention Policy (CG-54), who in turn oversees CG-542.

The Auxiliary has units in all 50 states, Puerto Rico, the Virgin Islands, American Samoa, and Guam. Under the direct authority of the U.S. Department of Homeland Security via the Commandant of the U.S. Coast Guard, the Auxiliary's internally operating levels are broken down into four organizational levels: Flotilla, Division, District and National.
 Flotillas: A Flotilla is the basic building block of the Auxiliary. While a flotilla should have at least 10 members, several flotillas have more than 100 members. Most of the day-to-day work of the Auxiliary is performed at the flotilla level. All members join the Auxiliary at the flotilla level and pay their annual membership dues to their flotilla, which normally meet on a monthly basis.  Visitors and prospective members are usually welcome to attend.
 Divisions: At least four (4) flotillas form a Division, which provides leadership, direction, and staff assistance to the flotillas so that their programs can run effectively.
 Districts/Regions: There are several divisions in a District. The District provides leadership and staff assistance to the Divisions. Each Auxiliary District is supervised by a Director of the Auxiliary who is an Active Duty Coast Guard officer usually holding the rank of Commander. Auxiliary Districts generally coincide with Coast Guard Districts.
 Areas: Three Deputy National Commodores are responsible for three geographic areas: Atlantic East, Atlantic West, and Pacific Area, respectively.
 National:  The Auxiliary has national officers who are responsible, along with the Commandant, for the administration and policy-making for the entire Auxiliary. These include the National Executive Committee (NEXCOM) that is composed of the Chief Director of Auxiliary (CHDIRAUX – an active duty officer), the National Commodore (NACO), the Immediate Past National Commodore (IPNACO), Vice National Commodore (VNACO), and the four Deputy National Commodores (DNACOs) which in turn is part of the National Staff Operating Committee (OPCOM). OPCOM consists of twenty-nine (29) members: eight (8) NEXCOM members listed above, National Executive Staff consisting of eight (8) Assistant National Commodores (ANACO), and fourteen (14) Directorate Directors (DIR). These individuals along with their respective staff in the various national directorates make up the Auxiliary Headquarters organization. The Chief Director is a senior Coast Guard officer and directs the administration of the Auxiliary on policies established by the Commandant. The overall supervision of the Auxiliary is under the Deputy Commandant for Operations (CG-DCO), who reports directly to the Commandant (CCG).

Leadership and staffing
District Commodores, District Chiefs of Staff, Division Commanders, Division Vice Commanders, Flotilla Commanders, and Flotilla Vice Commanders are elected annually to provide overall organizational leadership. Staff officers are appointed by these elected officers to oversee various program areas.

The Coast Guard Auxiliary does not have a military chain of command; it does, however, have a similar concept called the "Chain of Leadership and Management" (or "COLM"). Auxiliarists are expected to adhere to the COLM when issuing instructions and seeking direction/guidance on policy matters. There are actually two COLM's. Staff officers at each level report to both their own elected unit leader and to the staff officer in the equivalent position at the next highest level of the organization (this is known as "parallel staffing"). For example, a flotilla staff officer overseeing the flotilla's public education program (the "FSO-PE") reports to both his/her own Flotilla Commander (through the Flotilla Vice Commander) and the division staff officer for public education (the "SO-PE").

National officers
The national leadership is elected once every two years. National officer positions include the following:

 The National Commodore of the United States Coast Guard Auxiliary (NACO) is the most senior and principal officer of the United States Coast Guard Auxiliary. The national commodore represents the Auxiliary and reports to the commandant of the Coast Guard through the Vice Commandant of the Coast Guard. Additionally, the National Commodore represents the Auxiliary with all Coast Guard flag officers and flag officer equivalent civilians at Coast Guard headquarters on Auxiliary matters.   The National Commodore functions to support the Commandant's strategic goals and objectives and serve auxiliarists.
 Vice National Commodore (VNACO) – The VNACO is the chief operating officer of the Coast Guard Auxiliary and reports to the National Commodore (NACO). Additionally, the VNACO represents the Auxiliary at the direction of the NACO with all Coast Guard Flag officers and Flag officer equivalent civilians at Coast Guard Headquarters on Auxiliary matters.
 Deputy National Commodore (DNACO) – The Auxiliary has four Deputy National Commodores (DNACO) who report to the Vice National Commodore. Three are elected (Mission Support, Operations, and Recreational Boating Safety), and one is appointed (Information Technology and Planning).  Each DNACO has a specific set of operational areas of responsibility to include one or more of the appointed Assistant National Commodores (staff officers). Additionally, each of the three elected DNACOs are the reporting point for approximately one third of the 16 District Commodores, grouped by geographical area, who are elected every two years to lead their local membership.
 Assistant National Commodore (ANACO) – Eight Assistant National Commodores form the National Executive Staff and are appointed to either lead multiple national directorates or perform specialized roles (such as Chief Counsel or Diversity). They are expected to consult and coordinate with appropriate Coast Guard Flag officers and program managers in coordination with the Chief Director to determine requirements for Auxiliary resources used within their areas of responsibilities and develop and manage Auxiliary programs consistent with Coast Guard needs and objectives.
 Immediate Past National Commodore (NIPCO) – The NIPCO is the most recent predecessor of the National Commodore office and serves on the National Executive Committee.
 Director (DIR) – Appointed top officers of the Auxiliary's various National Directorates: Government & Public Affairs (A); RBS Outreach (B); Computer Software & Systems (C); Public Education (E); Human Resources (H); International Affairs (I); Performance Management (M); Prevention (P); Emergency Management & Disaster Response (Q); Response (R); Strategic Planning (S); Training (T); IT User Support & Services (U); Vessel Examination & RBS Visitation (V).
 Deputy Director (DIRd) – Appointed aide officers of the Auxiliary's various National Directorate Directors. They are the second-highest appointed officers within a Directorate and lead alongside the Directors.
 Division Chief (DVC) – The DVCs manage a broad program sector within each directorate under the director and deputy director.
 Branch Chief (BC) – The BCs oversee specialized functions and programs on the National Staff, and are directly responsible for carrying out many of the National Staff functions within their Directorate. They work under the direction of the Division Chief.
 Branch Assistant (BA) – The BAs serve as support staff under a Branch Chief, carrying out national-level tasks and duties provided by their respective BC.

District officers
 District Director of the Auxiliary (DIRAUX) – An active duty Coast Guard officer, usually a commander, who is dedicated full-time to Auxiliary functions in his or her district. The DIRAUX has sole responsibility for enrolling a new member or for disenrolling an existing member. The DIRAUX is also the final authority in all matters related to his or her Auxiliary district.  Each DIRAUX has small staff of active duty members, Auxiliarists, and civilian employees to assist with these functions.
 District Commodore (DCO) – The highest elected officer within the district, elected by the Division Commanders, the District Commodore supervises all Auxiliary activities within his or her district.
 District Chief of Staff (DCOS) (formerly District Vice Commodore [VCO]) – The district's Chief of Staff and Assistant to the District Commodore. Elected by the Division Commanders in the district.
 District Captains (DCAPT) (formerly District Rear Commodore [RCO]) (two or more per district) – Elected by all Division Commanders and usually supervise a group of divisions in a district. They may also have programmatic responsibilities.
 District Directorate Chiefs (DDC) – Some districts appoint DDCs based on the three major areas of Auxiliary activity (i.e., Prevention, Response, and Logistics). They are appointed by the DCO and approved by DIRAUX.
 District Staff Officers (DSO) – Manage the district's departments and programs; appointed by the DCO and approved by DIRAUX.
 Assistant District Staff Officers (ADSO) – Assist with the management of district departments under the direction and guidance of the DSO; appointed by the DCO with concurrence of DCOS. DSO's report to the DCOS (through a DDC, where applicable).

Division officers
 Division Commander (DCDR) (formerly Division Captain) – The highest elected Auxiliary leader within a division. Elected by the Flotilla Commanders in a Division.
 Division Vice Commander (VCDR) – Division Chief of Staff and assistant to the Division Commander. Elected by the Flotilla Commanders in a division.
 Division Staff Officers (SO) – Manage the division's departments and programs; appointed by the DCDR.

Flotilla officers

Titles and duties of flotilla officers are dictated by the Auxiliary Manual.
 Flotilla Commander (FC) – The highest elected Auxiliary leader within a flotilla. He/she is elected by the members of a flotilla. Recommends new members for enrollment to the DIRAUX.
 Flotilla Vice Commander (VFC) – The flotilla's Chief of Staff and assistant to the Flotilla Commander. Elected by the members of a Flotilla.
 Flotilla Staff Officers (FSO) – Responsible for managing the flotilla's departments and programs; appointed by the FC.
 Detachment Leader (DL) – Serves as the leader for a DIRAUX approved flotilla detachment. This officer is appointed by the FC and wears the insignia of an FSO.

Staff officers
To carry out the Auxiliary program, DCDRs and FCs may appoint flotilla and division staff officers. The DCO may appoint district staff officers. A staff officer at the flotilla level is abbreviated FSO; at the division level, SO; and at the District level, DSO. Thus, the SO-CS is the Division Communications Services officer.

The list of staff officers, with their official abbreviations, is:
 Aviation (AV) (district level only)
 Culinary Assistance (CA)
 Communications (CM)
 Communication Services (CS)
 Diversity (DV)
 Finance (FN)
 Flight Safety Officer (DFSO) (district level only)
 Food Service (FS) (division level and above)
 Human Resources (HR)
 Information Services (IS)
 Legal/Parliamentarian (LP) (district level only)
 Marine Safety and Environmental Protection (MS)
 Materials (MA)
 Member Training (MT)
 Navigation Systems (NS)
 Operations (OP)
 Public Affairs (PA)
 Publications (PB)
 Public Education (PE)
 Recreational Boating Safety Visitation Program (PV)
 Sea Scouts ("AUXSCOUT" program) (AS)
 Secretary/Records (SR)
 Vessel Examination (VE)

Uniforms and insignia

Uniforms

Auxiliarists are not required to purchase uniforms as a condition of joining, but uniforms are required for certain activities and missions.  Each auxiliary uniform is identical to a Coast Guard officer's military uniform, with the exception that the buttons and stripes on dress jackets and shoulder boards are silver in color, rather than gold. On dress uniforms, appointed staff officers wear insignia with a red "A" and elected officers wear insignia with either a silver or a blue "A", while black "A"s are worn on insignia by both elected and appointed officers on the ODU uniform.  Auxiliarists are generally expected to adhere to the same rules of correct uniform wear as regular and reserve Coast Guard officers, although some standards are slightly relaxed (e.g. Auxiliarists are allowed to have beards).

When augmenting Coast Guard personnel in an operational environment (e.g. serving as a cook on a cutter at sea), the military-style officer insignia of Auxiliary position is generally removed and the generic "member" insignia is worn. This is done to avoid giving the impression that the Auxiliarist has any command authority over the vessel in the event of contact with foreign military personnel or a hostile force.

Auxiliary insignia, titles, and military etiquette

Auxiliarists wear military rank-style insignia that signify their leadership position (e.g., a Flotilla Commander wears insignia similar to a USCG lieutenant) but do not hold substantive military ranks and are not typically addressed by their position title. All members are generally referred to as "Auxiliarist" (abbreviated "AUX") except for those members who hold (or formerly held) senior leadership positions equivalent to flag officers (Admirals), who are addressed as "Commodore" (abbreviated "COMO"). Specifically, the use of an office title before names is proper only for current or past Commodores. Use of a title like Commodore Lucy Jones is proper for a current or past commodore (e.g., National Commodore, Deputy National Commodore, Assistant National Commodore, or District Commodore). For elected or appointed staff officers such as a District Chief of Staff, District Captain, division leadership, or flotilla leadership, the name is followed by the office title (e.g., Mr. Sam Rosenberg, District Captain, Ms. Marion Lewis, Division Staff Officer, Mr. Xing Hueng, Flotilla Commander, etc.).

Auxiliarists also do not customarily render military courtesies (such as saluting) to each other, but to do so is not forbidden. Auxiliarist are expected to initiate salutes and render other appropriate courtesies to military officers who are senior to the equivalent office insignia held by the Auxiliarist, observe proper flag etiquette, etc. Enlisted personnel, Warrant Officers and Commissioned Officers of the Coast Guard are not required to salute Auxiliarists but occasionally do, in which case Auxiliarists are expected to return all salutes given.

The purpose of the Auxiliary's rank-style insignia is not to signify authority but to identify the Auxiliarist's position within the organization and recognize the responsibilities of elected and appointed leaders and staff officers. Past elected and appointed leaders are authorized to permanently wear the insignia of the highest office held if they held such office for at least half of its term. However, when an Auxiliarist no longer holds the office represented by the insignia worn, a "Past Officer Device" must be worn on the right pocket flap of the uniform shirt or service dress jacket.

Office title and insignia

Pledge
Auxiliarists ascribe to the following pledge during induction:

I, (your name), solemnly and sincerely pledge myself, to support the United States Coast Guard Auxiliary, and its purposes, to faithfully execute my duties, and to abide by the governing policies, established by the Commandant, of the United States Coast Guard.

Medals, awards, and citations
Auxiliarists may be awarded medals and decorations of the Coast Guard or Coast Guard Auxiliary, and may wear certain medals and decorations awarded in prior military service based on what is approved in the Auxiliary Manual. There are currently 36 medals and ribbons for which auxiliarists are eligible.

United States Coast Guard awards:

  USCG Aux Distinguished Service Award
  USCG Aux Legion of Merit
  USCG Aux Plaque of Merit
  USCG Aux Meritorious Service Award
  USCG Aux Medal of Operational Merit
  USCG Aux Commendation Medal
  USCG Aux Achievement Medal
  USCG Aux Commandant Letter of Commendation
  USCG Aux Sustained Service Award
  Coast Guard Auxiliary Operational Excellence "E" Ribbon
  USCG Aux Humanitarian Service Award
  USCG Aux Recruiting Service Award
  USCG Aux Specialty Training Ribbon
  USCG Aux Marine Safety Trident Training Ribbon
  USCG Aux Operations Program Ribbon
  USCG Aux Examiner Program Ribbon
  USCG Aux Instructor Program Ribbon
  USCG Aux Public Affairs Ribbon
  USCG Aux Membership Service Ribbon
  USCG Aux Flotilla Meritorious Achievement Medal
  USCG Aux Vessel Examination and RBS Visitation Program Service Performance Award
  USCG Aux Public Education Service Award
  USCG Aux Operations Service Award

Other awards authorized for wear on the Coast Guard Auxiliary uniform:

  Guardian Medal
  Transportation 9-11 Medal
  Coast Guard Presidential Unit Citation
  DHS Outstanding Unit Award
  Secretary of Transportation Outstanding Unit Award
  Coast Guard Unit Commendation
  Coast Guard Meritorious Unit Commendation
  Meritorious Team Commendation
  Coast Guard Bicentennial Unit Commendation
  Transportation 9-11 Ribbon
  Coast Guard Special Operations Ribbon
  Coast Guard Recruiting Service Ribbon

Badges

Qualification badges
Qualification Badges of the United States Coast Guard Auxiliary are approved and issued by the United States Coast Guard's DIRAUX to auxiliarists who achieve certain qualifications while serving in the United States Coast Guard Auxiliary. Auxiliarists may wear qualification badges/insignia earned during prior military service but must do so in accordance with Coast Guard uniform standards (i.e., only two such badges may be worn on service uniforms and one on ODU's). Listed below are the qualification badges awarded by the Coast Guard to Auxiliarists:

Qualification insignia

Service identification badges
All auxiliarists currently on the National Staff may wear the National Staff Badge. Auxiliarists who volunteer in recruiting offices and satisfy certain requirements may be authorized to wear the Coast Guard Recruiting Badge. Auxiliarists who meet the requirements of the Academy Admissions Partner Program and are approved by the Superintendent of the United States Coast Guard Academy may also be entitled to wear the Coast Guard Academy Admissions Recruiting Badge.

Benefits

The United States Coast Guard Auxiliary offers a number of benefits and fellowship opportunities. Auxiliarists are allowed access to the Coast Guard Exchange and have opportunities for training, awards, and uniforms. Some expenses incurred by the auxiliarist may be tax deductible.  Auxiliarists are allowed access to the Coast Guard Mutual Assistance Program. Auxiliary Flotillas are also supported by the Coast Guard Foundation.

While on official orders, if an Auxiliarist is injured or killed in the line of duty, they may be entitled to compensation on a monthly pay rate equivalent to the GS-9 on the General Schedule Payscale.

Identification Card
Auxiliarists are issued an official identification card from the U.S. Coast Guard by their local Director of Auxiliary (DIRAUX) only after the USCG Security Center completes a Personnel Security Investigation and issues a favorable suitability-for-service determination. The card also serves as an identification that the Auxiliarist falls under the protocols of the Geneva Conventions (specifically the Fourth Geneva Convention).

Coast Guard Auxiliary Association

The Coast Guard Auxiliary Association (CGAuxA) is a 501(c)(3) non-profit organization based out of St. Louis, Missouri that raises and donates money to support outreach activities of the auxiliary. According to its website, the organization was established in 1957 and supports the Auxiliary with its mission to support Recreational Boater Safety, fundraising, and provides the Auxiliary with needed supplies. In addition Auxiliary Association members have access to the Pentagon Federal Credit Union.  The Coast Guard Auxiliary has also established a number of national partnerships for discounts on office supplies, hotels, rental cars, prescriptions, and insurance. The Auxiliary Association is led by a ten-member Board of Directors that receives no compensation. Auxiliarists are automatically extended a free membership to the Auxiliary Association.

Eligibility for Membership
Potential applicants must be a United States citizen, be at minimum 17 years of age, and prior members of the United States Armed Forces must provide proof that they were discharged at minimum under honorable conditions. Applicants must have never committed a felony and have a social security number that is valid.  While the auxiliary attracts boat owners and veterans of the armed forces, neither is a requirement to join and both are common misconceptions.

Sea Scouts are eligible to join at age 14, under an exception granted by agreement between both organizations.

Status Level Qualifications
In order to qualify for membership the applicant must fill out an application and get fingerprinted. The initial applicant must successfully complete the new member course and pass the new member examination. After successfully passing the applicant will be issued a new member ID number and will be placed into approval pending (AP) status until their PSI is adjudicated. Starting 1 February 2018, new auxiliarists under AP Status must pass the Basic Qualification Course II which consists of seven tested modules based on the Auxiliary Manual before they can be granted any higher status.

If the PSI is favorably adjudicated the auxiliarist may be eligible to be placed into initially qualified (IQ) status, and those who have an unfavorable PSI adjudication will be disenrolled from the Auxiliary.  Members in IQ status are not eligible for basically qualified (BQ) status until they have successfully completed all required mandatory training.  After all mandatory training has been completed, the auxiliarist enters BQ status.  BQ status is considered “full membership” and is ordinarily required to hold elected or appointed office and to pursue qualification in moats fields. Beyond that, the auxilarist may pursue operational auxiliarist (AX) qualification, which involves taking courses on seamanship, meteorology, radio communications, leadership, etc.

Training

Auxiliarists with prior service are likely to have a smooth transition into their flotilla as they are able to come up to speed with current Coast Guard Auxiliary responsibilities and military customs.  Prior service in the United States Armed Forces such as military service insignia, badges, ribbons, and devices earned may potentially be worn on the Auxiliary uniform based on what is approved in the Auxiliary Manual.

Operational Auxiliarist

Operational Auxiliarist (or "AUXOP") is the highest Auxiliary membership status, requiring completion of certain advanced training in subject areas that support operational capabilities.  This program has been in existence since 1952 and was established under leadership of National Commodore Bert Pouncey. AUXOP was created to better assist the Coast Guard to fill needed skill sets and to assist with operational Coast Guard missions. In order to achieve the Operational Auxiliarist distinction seven credits must be completed from three different types of courses. Core, Leadership, and Electives are the different required course types. Specialty courses in weather, seamanship, and communications are required in the core curriculum that are all good for a credit each.  An additional four credits are required under the leadership and elective course types. Upon completing the training program the Auxiliarist is entitled to wear the AUXOP Device.  AUXOP advanced training also helps the Auxiliarist to increase their support capability and capacity to assist with operational missions for the Coast Guard.

Core training
Auxiliarists are required to complete six mandated training courses within their first year of joining the organization, and then must complete them all again every five years after.  These six courses cover Fundamentals of Security, Suicide Prevention, Privacy, Sexual Harassment & Assault Prevention, and civil rights awareness. In addition, auxiliarists must complete influenza and ethics awareness just once in their career using the Coast Guard Auxiliary Learning Management System.

Failure to complete the mandatory training may make the auxiliarist ineligible to participate in Coast Guard Auxiliary exercises, drills, or response events.

Incident Command System training recognized by the Coast Guard Auxiliary 

The Coast Guard Auxiliary requires auxiliarists to take mandatory Incident Command System (ICS) courses. Four of the Incident Command System (ICS) courses are offered through FEMA's Emergency Management Institute (EMI) and another course if offered through the Auxiliary Learning Management System.  Auxiliarists are expected to take courses that will help them to understand the Incident Command System's organization, basic terminology and common responsibilities.  Auxiliarists are required to acquire the skills necessary to perform in an ICS support role. Officers, certified coxswains, pilots, or those in a leadership role may need to take additional EMI courses pertaining to the National Incident Management System and/or the National Response Framework.  As part of ICS Training, all auxiliarists must respond immediately to emergency response alerts and participation in mandatory.

FEMA courses 

Note: IS-100 and IS-700 are part of the Mandatory Training requirement.

AUX LMS course

C-School Training
The Coast Guard sponsors over 15 different advanced training courses for auxiliarists to take at C-Schools.  Selection to attend a C-School is competitive due to limited availability, and the training is for auxiliarists who want to be promoted in their levels of responsibility.  To attend a C-School course the auxiliarist must first be approved by their DIRAUX who will issue then issue official orders to the auxiliarist. When an auxiliarist is attending a C-School course their lodging and per diem are typically reimbursed by the Coast Guard.  C-School opportunities include leadership training which are offered at three levels: AUXLAMS (Leadership and Management), AMLOC (Mid-Level Officer course), and AULOC (Upper-Level Officer course).

Center for Homeland Defense and Security Courses
Auxiliarists may register and participate in the Naval Postgraduate School Center for Homeland Defense and Security Self Study Courses. As of 2019 over 10 online courses are available.

Legal protection
While assigned to federal duty, auxiliarists are considered federal employees for the purpose of civil liability; therefore, individual auxiliarists are protected against being sued directly in many tort, property, and injury cases arising from their official duties. Furthermore, during wartime, Coast Guard auxiliarists fall under the protocols of the Geneva Conventions (specifically the Fourth Geneva Convention).

Employment protection
A handful of states offer limited employment protection for members of the auxiliary who are called to assist emergency responders following a disaster or to attend to other auxiliary matters.
 Auxiliarists who work for the state of Missouri are entitled to a leave of absence totaling fifteen days per year (with this upper limit waived in the event they are responding to a state or national declared disaster or emergency). Aside from being protected from termination as a result of their absence from work, they are also guaranteed protection against loss of time, pay, regular leave, impairment of efficiency rating, or of any other rights or benefits to which the employee would otherwise be entitled.
 State, city, and county employees in the state of Arkansas who are auxiliarists are also entitled to a leave of absence to respond to emergencies, limited to fifteen days per calendar year. During their deployment, they are protected against loss of seniority rights, efficiency or performance ratings, promotional status, retirement privileges, and life and disability insurance benefits, and any other employment benefits. These government employees may not be required to use their vacation time to cover their absence.
 State, city, and county employees in the state of New Jersey who are auxiliarists are entitled to a leave of absence, the first five days of which must be paid, to attend state or national conventions hosted by the Coast Guard Auxiliary. The employee's job is guaranteed upon their return.

Gallery

Notable auxiliarists and honorary commodores

Line-of-duty deaths 

Since the establishment of the Coast Guard Auxiliary, a number of Auxiliarists have perished in the line of duty.

See also
 Badges of the United States Coast Guard
 Civil Air Patrol
 Commandant of the Coast Guard
 Incident Command System
 International Search and Rescue Competition
 Naval militia
 North American Safe Boating Campaign
 State defense force
 United States Coast Guard Reserve
 United States Coast Guard
 United States Department of Homeland Security
 United States Power Squadrons
 National Commodore (United States Coast Guard Auxiliary)
 Uniforms of the United States Coast Guard Auxiliary
 History of the United States Coast Guard Auxiliary
 Semper Paratus (march)

References

External links
 United States Coast Guard

1939 establishments in the United States
Articles containing video clips
Auxiliary military units
Sea rescue organizations
United States Coast Guard